Glow is the Scottish Schools National Intranet.  This is a major national ICT and telecommunications programme managed by Education Scotland. The funding for Glow came from the Scottish Government and the project is a collaboration between local authorities, Education Scotland and RM Education. It uses a network named RM Unify to sign users in, as well as showing when it's going to be down.

Initial rollout

Preparation for Glow began with an investigatory phase known as Phase Zero, which involved checking that Glow could interface with the management information systems of the 32 Education Authorities in Scotland in order to provide the anticipated 800,000 accounts. Glow was then piloted over a number of stages, and at each stage further functionality was introduced and tested.

Up and running by 2009, it became the world's first national education internet.

References

 Education in Scotland